Liv and Maddie (Music from the TV Series) is a soundtrack to the Disney Channel Original Series, Liv and Maddie. It features 12 songs performed by the show's star, Dove Cameron and a song performed by Teen Beach Movie star, Jordan Fisher. The soundtrack was released on March 17, 2015 by Walt Disney Records.

Singles

Promotional singles
"On Top of the World" by Imagine Dragons was released as the first promotional single from the soundtrack, by Walt Disney Records on August 27, 2013. "Better in Stereo", was released as the second promotional single by Walt Disney Records on October 15, 2013. A music video was filmed and aired on Disney Channel the night of October 29, 2013. "Count Me In" was released as third promotional single on June 3, 2014. "You, Me and the Beat" was released as fourth promotional single on December 2, 2014. "What a Girl Is" featuring Christina Grimmie and Baby Kaely, was released on March 5, 2015 as the fifth and final promotional single.

Track listing

Charts

References

Dove Cameron albums
Walt Disney Records soundtracks
2015 soundtrack albums
Television soundtracks